American entertainer Britney Spears has embarked on ten headlining concert tours, five of which have been worldwide. According to Pollstar, Spears has grossed $485 million throughout her career. She first served as an opening act for NSYNC before starting her 1999 headlining debut, the ...Baby One More Time Tour, which was based in North America only. Its success prompted an extension of dates entitled (You Drive Me) Crazy Tour. The tour was positively received by critics but generated some controversy due to her racy outfits. Jae-Ha Kim of the Chicago Sun-Times commented that "Spears has that 'it' factor that worked for pinup queens of the past." In 2000–01, she performed on the worldwide Oops!... I Did It Again Tour. It was critically appreciated for Spears's energy and performance, as well as the band. She then followed this with the Dream Within a Dream Tour in 2001–02, visiting Japan and Mexico for the first time. The performances were accompanied by many special effects, the pièce de résistance being a water screen that pumped two tons of water onto the stage during the encore performance of "...Baby One More Time". During a concert in Mexico, Spears stopped the show three songs into the setlist because it was too dangerous to perform in the rainstorm.

The Onyx Hotel Tour (2004) was her comeback tour after a two-year break from music following her split from Justin Timberlake. Spears was inspired to create a show set in different areas of a hotel and mixed it with the concept of onyx stone, that symbolized untapped desire. The tour was canceled after Spears hurt her knee while shooting the music video for "Outrageous". The Onyx Hotel Tour grossed $34 million, in addition to $30 million of merchandise, making Spears the highest-grossing merchandise female artist. Her next tour was The M+M's Tour in 2007. This tour consisted of six short, 15-minute shows in House of Blues clubs around the United States. A Miami concert was planned at the Mansion Nightclub, but ultimately the show did not occur. She did not tour again until The Circus Starring Britney Spears in 2009. All the North American shows were sold out, and it broke attendance records in some cities. It went on to become the fifth highest-grossing tour of 2009, with approximately US$131.8 million in ticket sales. After the debut of her seventh studio album Femme Fatale, Spears embarked on her Femme Fatale Tour, which visited North America, Europe, South America, and Asia.

On December 27, 2013, Spears began her debut concert residency, Britney: Piece of Me, at Planet Hollywood Resort & Casino in Las Vegas. Originally scheduled to run for two years, the show's success led to a two-year extension, with her final performance on December 31, 2017. During the summer of 2017, Spears brought the show to Asia as an international tour, marketed as Britney: Live in Concert. In 2018, Spears continued the show in the United States and Europe as the Piece of Me Tour.

Concert tours
{|class="wikitable sortable plainrowheaders" style="text-align:center;" width=100%
!scope="col" style="width:20%;"| Title
!scope="col" style="width:20%;"| Dates
!scope="col" style="width:15%;"| Associated album(s)
!scope="col" style="width:15%;"| Continent(s)
!scope="col" style="width:10%;"| Shows
!scope="col" style="width:10%;"| Gross
!scope="col" style="width:10%;"| Attendance
!scope="col" width=2% class="unsortable" | 
|-
!scope="row" style="text-align:center;"| ...Baby One More Time Tour
|  – September 15, 1999
|...Baby One More Time
|North America
|56
|
|
|
|-
| colspan="8" style="border-bottom-width:3px; padding:5px;" |

|-
!scope="row" style="text-align:center;"| (You Drive Me) Crazy Tour
|  – April 24, 2000
|...Baby One More TimeOops!... I Did It Again
|North America
|25
|
|
|
|-
| colspan="8" style="border-bottom-width:3px; padding:5px;" |
{{hidden
| headercss = font-size: 100%; width: 95%;
| contentcss = text-align: left; font-size: 100%; width: 95%;
| header =  (You Drive Me) Crazy Tour setlist
| content =

"(You Drive Me) Crazy"
"Born to Make You Happy"
"I Will Be There"
"Don't Let Me Be the Last to Know"
"Oops!... I Did It Again"
"From the Bottom of My Broken Heart"
"The Beat Goes On"
"Sometimes"
Encore
 "...Baby One More Time"

}}
|-
!scope="row" style="text-align:center;"| Oops!... I Did It Again Tour
|  – January 18, 2001
|Oops!... I Did It Again
| EuropeNorth AmericaSouth America
|88
|
|
|
|-
| colspan="8" style="border-bottom-width:3px; padding:5px;" |
{{hidden
| headercss = font-size: 100%; width: 95%;
| contentcss = text-align: left; font-size: 100%; width: 95%;
| header =  Oops!... I Did It Again Tour setlist
| content =

 "(You Drive Me) Crazy"
 "Stronger"
 "What U See (Is What U Get)"
 "From the Bottom of My Broken Heart"
 "Born to Make You Happy"
 "Lucky"
 "Sometimes"
 "Don't Let Me Be the Last to Know"
 "The Beat Goes On"
 "Don't Go Knockin' on My Door"
 "(I Can't Get No) Satisfaction"
 "...Baby One More Time"
Encore
 "Oops!... I Did It Again"

}}
|-
!scope="row" style="text-align:center;"| Dream Within a Dream Tour
|  – July 28, 2002
|Britney
| North AmericaAsia
|69
|
|
|
|-
| colspan="8" style="border-bottom-width:3px; padding:5px;" |

|-
!scope="row" style="text-align:center;"| The Onyx Hotel Tour
|  – June 6, 2004
|In the Zone
| North AmericaEurope
|54
|
|
|
|-
|-
| colspan="8" style="border-bottom-width:3px; padding:5px;" |

|-
!scope="row" style="text-align:center;"| The M+M's Tour
|  – May 20, 2007
|
|North America
|6
|
|
|
|-
| colspan="8" style="border-bottom-width:3px; padding:5px;" |

|-
!scope="row" style="text-align:center;"| The Circus Starring Britney Spears
|  – November 29, 2009
|Circus
| EuropeNorth AmericaOceania
|97
|
|
|
|-
| colspan="8" style="border-bottom-width:3px; padding:5px;" |
{{hidden
| headercss = font-size: 100%; width: 95%;
| contentcss = text-align: left; font-size: 100%; width: 95%;
| header =  The Circus Starring Britney Spears setlist
| content =

 "Circus"
 "Piece of Me"
 "Radar"
"Ooh Ooh Baby" / "Hot as Ice"
"Boys"
"If U Seek Amy"
"Me Against the Music" 
"Everytime"
"Freakshow"
"Get Naked (I Got a Plan)"
"Breathe on Me" / "Touch of My Hand"
"Do Somethin'"
"I'm a Slave 4 U"
"Toxic"
"...Baby One More Time"
Encore
 "Womanizer" 

}}
|-
!scope="row" style="text-align:center;"| Femme Fatale Tour
|  – December 10, 2011
|Femme Fatale
| AsiaEuropeNorth AmericaSouth America
|79
|
|
|
|-
| colspan="8" style="border-bottom-width:3px; padding:5px;" |

|-
!scope="row" style="text-align:center;"| Britney: Live in Concert
|  – July 3, 2017
|
|Asia
|11
|
|
|
|-
| colspan="8" style="border-bottom-width:3px; padding:5px;" |
{{hidden
| headercss = font-size: 100%; width: 95%;
| contentcss = text-align: left; font-size: 100%; width: 95%;
| header =  Britney: Live in Concert setlist
| content =

"Work Bitch"
"Womanizer"
"Break the Ice" / "Piece of Me"
"...Baby One More Time" / "Oops!... I Did It Again"
"Me Against the Music"
"Gimme More"
"Boys"
"Do You Wanna Come Over?"
"I'm a Slave 4 U"
"Make Me..."
"Freakshow"
"Do Somethin'"
"Circus"
"If U Seek Amy"
"Breathe on Me"
"Slumber Party"
"Touch of My Hand"
"Toxic"
"Stronger" / "(You Drive Me) Crazy"
Encore
"Till the World Ends"

}}
|-
!scope="row" style="text-align:center;"| Piece of Me Tour
|  – October 21, 2018
|
|North AmericaEurope
|31
|
|
|
|-
| colspan="8" style="border-bottom-width:3px; padding:5px;" |
{{hidden
| headercss = font-size: 100%; width: 95%;
| contentcss = text-align: left; font-size: 100%; width: 95%;
| header =  Piece of Me Tour setlist
| content =

"Work Bitch"
"Womanizer"
"Break the Ice" / "Piece of Me"
"...Baby One More Time" / "Oops!... I Did It Again"
"Me Against the Music"
"Gimme More"
"Clumsy" / "Change Your Mind (No Seas Cortes)"
"Boys"
"Do You Wanna Come Over?"
"I'm a Slave 4 U" 
"Make Me..."
"Freakshow"
"Do Somethin'"
"Circus"
"If U Seek Amy"
"Breathe on Me"
"Slumber Party"
"Touch of My Hand"
"Toxic"
"Stronger" / "(You Drive Me) Crazy"
Encore
"Till the World Ends"

}}
|}

Concert residencies

Promotional tours

Promotional performances

References

Bibliography

External links
Britney Spears: Events at Britney Spears official website

Live performances
Britney Spears